Christopher Mussman (born July 12, 1968) is an American football coach and former player. In March 2014 Mussman was hired as the co-offensive coordinator and quarterbacks coach at St. Cloud State University. He served as head football coach at the University of North Dakota from 2008 to 2013, compiling a record of 31–34.

Mussman was a four-year letter-winner and starting offensive lineman at Iowa State University from 1987 to 1990. He earned a bachelor's degree from Iowa State in 1991 and a master's degree from Minnesota State University, Mankato in 1994. Mussman was hired as the 25th head coach of the Fighting Sioux on January 4, 2008. After bringing his team back from a 20-point deficit against South Dakota, Mussman was named Great West Conference Coach of the Year.

Head coaching record

References

External links
 St. Cloud State profile
 North Dakota profile

1968 births
Living people
American football offensive linemen
Iowa State Cyclones football players
Minnesota State Mavericks football coaches
North Dakota Fighting Hawks football coaches
St. Cloud State Huskies football coaches
Minnesota State University, Mankato alumni
People from Owatonna, Minnesota